is a train station in the city of Shiojiri, Nagano Prefecture, Japan, operated by East Japan Railway Company (JR East).

Lines
Hirooka Station is served by the Shinonoi Line and is 3.8 kilometers from the terminus of the line at Shiojiri Station.

Station layout
The station consists of two opposed ground-level side platforms, connected to the station building by a footbridge. The station has a  Midori no Madoguchi staffed ticket office.

Platforms

History
Hirooka Station opened on 10 July 1933. With the privatization of Japanese National Railways (JNR) on 1 April 1987, the station came under the control of JR East.

Passenger statistics
In fiscal 2015, the station was used by an average of 2552 passengers daily (boarding passengers only).

Surrounding area

See also
 List of railway stations in Japan

References

External links

 JR East station information 

Railway stations in Nagano Prefecture
Railway stations in Japan opened in 1933
Stations of East Japan Railway Company
Shinonoi Line
Shiojiri, Nagano